French hip hop is the hip hop music style developed in French-speaking countries. France is the second largest hip-hop market in the world after the United States.

History

Beginning of French hip hop: the 70s and 80s
By 1982 and 1983, a number of hip hop radio shows had appeared on Paris radio, including "Rapper Dapper" (hosted by Sidney Duteil) and "Funk à Billy" (hosted by DJ Dee Nasty). In November 1982 the New York City Rap Tour, traveled around France and to London featuring Afrika Bambaataa, Grandmixer DST, Fab 5 Freddy, Mr Freeze and the Rock Steady Crew.

The first major star of French hip hop was MC Solaar. Born Claude M'Barali in Dakar, Senegal, he moved as a child to France in 1970 and lived in Villeneuve-Saint-Georges. His 1991 album, Qui sème le vent récolte le tempo, was a major hit. The European Music Office's report on Music in Europe said that the French language was well-suited for rapping. He set many records, including being the first French hip hop recording artist to go platinum. Some artists claim that the French language hip hop style was influenced by the music of French singer Renaud.

Following MC Solaar's breakthrough, two broad styles emerged within the French hip hop scene; artists such as Solaar, Dee Nasty, and Lionel D championed a more mellow, sanguine style, while more hardcore performers such as Assassin and Suprême NTM assumed a more aggressive aesthetic. Many such artists found themselves at the heart of controversies over lyrics that were seen as glorifying the murder of police officers and other crimes, similar to outcries over violent thuggish lyrics in American gangsta rap. The cases include the notorious Ministère AMER's "Sacrifice de poulet", NTM's "Police" and later Lunatic's "Le crime paie".

Influence of American hip-hop
French hip-hop, like hip-hop in other countries, is highly influenced by American hip-hop. Columnist David Brooks wrote that "ghetto life, at least as portrayed in rap videos, now defines for the young, poor and disaffected what it means to be oppressed. Gangsta resistance is the most compelling model for how to rebel against that oppression." He argued that the gangster image of American hip hop appeals to mostly young & impoverished immigrant minorities in France, as a means to oppose the racism and oppression they experience. Jody Rosen counters Brooks' argument, criticizing that Brooks makes use of only a few, old samples of potential French gangsta rap that contain violent or misogynistic lyrics.  Brooks fails to accurately assess French hip hop's larger scope, and discounts its potential for "rappers of amazing skill, style, and wit."

Francophone rap was given a boost in the early 21st century by a decision of the French ministry of culture, which insisted that French-language stations play a minimum of 40 percent of French-language music during transmission.

This makes up one quarter of the radio's top 100, ten percent of local music production and has sold hundreds of thousands of CDs. French hip hop, however, is often criticized for imitating American hip hop style. French rapper MC Solaar agrees sarcastically, saying, "French rap is pretty much a U.S. branch office... we copy everything, don't we? We don't even take a step back."

Parts of American hip-hop culture have left a mark on the culture of French hip-hop as well in terms of fashion, clothing, music videos, jewelry, sounds and other things. Hip-hop culture was imported from America, especially with the influence of New York rappers and the music that came out of New York.

The 1990s and 2000s

Through the 1990s, the music grew to become one of the most popular genres in France; in 1997, IAM's release "L'école du Micro d'Argent" sold more than 1 million discs, with NTM moving more than 700,000 copies of their final album "Suprême NTM". The group went their separate ways in 2000.

As hip hop moved into a new millennium, French hip hop artists developed rapidly, seeing commercial success, and even some international appeal. One of the most influential French hip hop albums of all time, Cinquième As, was released by MC Solaar in 2001. At the same time, new artists like Sinik and Diam's began to see significant success, as well, bringing a new sound and genre of lyrical prowess to the game.

Themes

Themes in French hip hop include opposition to the social order, humor and puns, as well as ethnic and cultural identity. Whereas early French hip hop was seen as mimicking American hip hop in terms of aesthetic appeal, later French rappers added their own cultural and ethnic identities to the mix. With the rise of IAM's pharaoism, or allusions to ancient Egyptian pharaohs, the French hip hop artists are seen attempting to negotiate and create a space for themselves in a social scene rife with discrimination and racist ideologies.

French hip hop can be defined by two major categories or subgenres: hip-hop from the north, mainly centered around major cities like Paris and its suburbs, and hip-hop from the south which focuses around cities like Marseille. The different social climates in the regions make the two subgenres distinct from one another. Lyrics from the south tend to be more socially conscious, with content mainly focusing on the fight against discrimination. Rappers from the south of France are known to tell the 'cold reality' of life in France. In the north, however, content tends to be more straightforward, with rappers typically talking about the drug trade, gang wars, ghetto life and clashes with the police, etc.

Many of the French hip hop artists come from the poor urban areas on the outskirts of large cities known as banlieues ("suburbs"). Paris, Marseille, Lyon, Nantes, Lille, Strasbourg, Rennes, Caen, Le Havre, Rouen, Toulouse, Bordeaux, Grenoble and Nice have produced various French hip hop artists. The political and social status of the minority immigrant groups living in France have a direct influence on French hip hop. Many French rappers are products of the HLM rent-controlled housing and draw upon their upbringing in this environment as a source of inspiration for their lyrics. France's hip hop scene is, by far, the most active in Europe.

French hip hop has been political in its history as well. Hip-hop in France owes its success to a strong social demand for it. Historically, France adopted a series of hostile policy against immigrant families. For example, a contentious debate is currently being fought out in the political realm as to whether or not Muslim women should be permitted to wear head scarves. Domestic policy in the period since decolonization has resulted in the development of stifling set of inequalities. Most of these political outcries and demands are coming from the younger generation. Hip-Hop remains to be a place where young people can express their needs and themselves politically and freely.

The protest at the heart of French hip-hop can be traced directly to the economic boom following World War II. France required manpower to sustain its newly booming industries and the governmental solution was the mass immigration of peoples from regions of past French colonial empire to fill the gaps caused by shortage in personnel. As early as 1945, l'Office national d'immigration (ONI) was formed to supervise the immigration of new workers. Newly arrived Africans were not given the same employment opportunities as their French Caribbean counterparts because they were not citizens and often Africans ended up working as civil servants and menial employees living in dilapidated housing projects. Much of the resistance to social and economic imbalances in French hip-hop relate to this historically unequal situation. This is proved by lyrics of Aktivist's song, "Ils ont", the extract when translated states "Aktivist denounces intolerance to all immigrant fathers/Exploited in France since the 50s-60s/...their bodies are falling apart/And their children are still being judged according to their origins.

Relationship with Africa and the Caribbean
When hip-hop reached the European continent in the 1980s Afrika Bambaataa was an early pioneer, and when he came to France he was overwhelmed by the great importance of African culture coming from Africa and the Caribbean.

Many French hip hop artists express strong ties to Africa, though not overtly. Rappers from the 1980s and 90s needed to keep their references to Africa subtle for a few reasons. First, explicitly praising Africa would have been offensive to the many immigrants who fled Algeria and other North African countries because of the economic adversity they faced there, and many rappers probably had parents who had done so. Also, obvious Afrocentrism would have provided the French anti-Maghrebi  extreme right with an opportunity to tell Maghrebi  immigrants to return to North Africa. And finally, rising conservative Islamism in North Africa would have prevented rappers from being able to imitate their behavior in their native land.

The progress of rap in France is associated with the postcolonial relationships founded with former colonies of Africa and the Caribbean. Therefore, the definition of Africa according to French ideas, and the nature of racism in French society is crucial to understanding the reason for the hip hop and rap sensation in France. Rappers are overwhelmingly of African descent, and in tackling the issue of their invisibility in French society and declaring their origins, they redefine their identity and defy French notions of ethnicity and citizenship.

Some French hip hop artists of African origin have used their music to address challenges and issues that cause poverty in African nations. The French hip hop group Bisso Na Bisso's song "Dans la peau d'un chef" refers to the corruption of African heads of state. Though their music and the issues they cover focus more on their home country, the Republic of the Congo, all member of Bisso Na Bisso live in France and rap in French.  Although many artists that have dominated the hip hop scene in France are of African descent, themes dealing with the intimate connection between France and various African countries tend not to get much promotion on mainstream radio and even less consideration in scholarly research on the subject. While the popularity of nationally grown rap in France grew with the presence of MC Solaar, his involvement in the overall French hip hop subculture is non-existent as many consider his work to be in the traditional vein of French pop.

Specifically, IAM incorporates many African-related themes into its music.  Their 1991 song "Les tam-tam de l'Afrique" was one of the first French rap hits to deal explicitly with slavery. This particular track "focused on the plunder of Africa, the abduction of its inhabitants, the Middle Passage, and the plantation system in the Americas." It uses a sample from a Stevie Wonder song called "Past Time Paradise", which, appropriately, touches on race relations and slavery as well. Many other French hip hop artists made similar statements through their music, by collaborating to celebrate the 150th anniversary of the abolition of slavery in France in 1998. In order to mark the anniversary of the abolition of slavery in Martinique (which is an overseas department of France in the Caribbean), on May 22, Paris's Olympia theater hosted a concert that opened with "drummers chained together" and featured performances from "rappers of African descent such as Doc Gyneco, Stomy Bugsy, Arsenik, and Hamed Daye."

IAM also incorporates images associated with ancient Egypt.  Several group members assumed names reflective of this influence.  For example, IAM member Eric Mazel goes by the name Kheops, the name of the builder of the Egyptian pyramids.

The African music influences in French hip hop also extend to the use of African instruments such as the Kora, balafon, and ngoni. Many of the drums played in Africa and the Caribbean music such as "derbuka from North Africa, djembe from Senegal, gwo ka drums from Guadeloupe, bèlè drums from Martinique and Dominica, zouk, bouyon music, etc.). The mixture of the diverse traditional African, Caribbean, and other instrumentals is what produced the French hip-hop and made it distinct. It does not necessarily represent the French inside France, but rather the minority within France that has its own origins and African connection. The majority of the most influential rappers are from African and Caribbean origins like MC Solaar, Passi, Lady Laistee, Hamed Daye and many more. The youth of French immigrants in the community are not separated by radical conditions as in the United States, and they are not politically organized as in the United Kingdom. The suburbs are not real ghettos and the youth is not ethnically separated, they are all going to school with more equal chances and are therefore more integrated into society. Rap in French flow spontaneously and is much more explicit than English rap. MC Solaar rapidly emerged probably because of his very open and positive attitude, his strong literary talents and humour, becoming a spokesperson of his whole generation.

French Antilles hip hop

The French Antilles hip hop is a style of hip hop music originating from the French departments of Guadeloupe and Martinique in the Caribbean. Usually in French and Antillean creole, the French Antilles hip hop is most popular in the French Antilles and France.

Sidney Duteil (born Patrick Duteil in 1955 in Argenteuil, Val-d'Oise), better known as Sidney, is a French musician, rapper, DJ, television and radio host, and occasional actor of Guadeloupean origin.  He is well known in France for his connection with the beginnings of the French hip hop scene.

Language

Although hip hop in France has been greatly influenced by American hip hop culture, the lyrics remain typically in French.  Other than English, other language influences are based on oral traditions such as African griots, "talk over" of Jamaica and the blues. French music lyrics typically feature puns, play on words and suggestive phonetic combinations. Such artists as Boby Lapointe often use alliterations, onomatopoeia and puns or double entendre lyrics. The dialect of choice for many hip hop artists in France is verlan which is based on the inverse of original French words. In some cases artists rap in several different languages on a track including Arabic, French and English. The purpose of the lyrics, no matter the language, is "to popularize and vent the anger and frustrations of many disadvantaged and sometimes mistreated individuals, and to defend the cause of the poorest and least socially integrated segment of French society".

French hip hop stands out for its "flowing, expressive tones of the language [that] give it a clear identity within the rap world." In many French rap songs, verlan is used which is a slang that twists words by reversing and recombining them. This makes it difficult for even French speaking listeners to understand what the MC is saying. Even though it is difficult at times to understand completely the lyrics that are being said rappers still get the heat for causing violence and disturbance within society because of their intense message of rebelling against the system.

It is said that one of the most interesting points about French rap is the idea that "poetry and philosophy are greatly esteemed in France, and that they're even more greatly esteemed in French."

David Brooks claims that French rap is a copy of American gangsta rap of the early 1990s. However, his position was attacked by Jody Rosen in his article which debunks Brooks's belief that the French hip hop scene is no more than a carbon copy of earlier American work.

Like much of the hip hop from the United States, many French hip hop artists use the genre to address pressing social issues. The authors of "Arab Noise and Ramadan Nights: Rai, Rap, and Franco-Maghrebi Identity" state that French rappers rap about "the history of slavery, humanity's origins in Africa, Europe's destruction of African civilizations and the independence struggle led by the Front De Liberation Nationale." The components of their music are mostly influenced by the American rappers, but they also have their own style such as having their culture's tune in the beat. And they rap in their language and their phonetic sounds differ in time to time.

As France has embraced hip hop, they put a huge emphasis on the lyrics. They love to sing about love and poetry, and they also love to rap in French dialect. The French government has a mandate that 40 percent of the music played on the radio must be in French. Hip hop is a way for artists to express these feelings. More precisely, a hip hop built of French language lyrics laid on top of traditional break beats and samples.

Influence on pop culture

The image of the banlieue, comparable to what in the United States would be called one's "hood", has propagated itself into French pop culture in the form of clothing, accessories, attitude and of course the hip-hop music it yields. This fascination with the banlieue image has also found its way into the big screen with the movie B-13. This action/martial arts film depicts a somewhat exaggerated view of what one of the worst suburbs (which is what banlieue means, roughly translated) would be like 6 years in the future. One finds within this movie almost every iconic paradigm inherent to the gangster image in the U.S. We have a plethora of drugs and guns. We have a Don Corleone/Scarface figure who, under the influence of enough of his own product, considers himself invincible. There is, of course, a general disdain for corrupt police and politicians, and last but not least, there is the unfair imprisonment of the protagonist. The aforementioned traits contained the sub-plots of Menace II Society, Juice, Boyz n the Hood, Belly and New Jack City among other movies considered pivotal to gangsta rap culture. The obvious parallels seen in the glorification of the banlieue and that of one's "hood" is not one to overlook. The commonalities in the two cultures are indicative of the fact that  a.) almost every hip hop movement was bred from necessity and from rebellion. The guns, drugs and money of the hood are typically not the aftermath of an easy life but the result of a struggle whether it is as a hustler or as a gangbanger. Hip-hop provides an outlet for people in the struggle to lash out at the powers that be, and to rebel in some small way against the life they're stuck in. b.) the glorification of the banlieue also reminds us that there will always be a consumerist market of people, not in the struggle, who will take advantage of the allure of the image without totally understanding it.

Such as much of the rap and hip hop in the United States talks about money, women, guns, etc., rap in France is also somewhat following this path. Yet, many artists still rap about their ties to Africa, culture, and sending out important messages. However, hip hop in France is taking on the same image as hip hop in the United States. It's changed to talking about gang-banging and other illegal activities. Not only in France, but in many African countries, French hip hop is played and heard. "The images, modes and attitudes of hip-hop and gangsta rap are so powerful they are having a hegemonic effect across the globe."

Breakdancing
The break-dancing scene in France is widespread, and some French B-boys are well known for taking part in competitions such as BOTY. Two of the most well-known crews from France are the Vagabonds and the Pockemon, as both of them won the BOTY.

References
Krümm, Philippe and Jean-Pierre Rasle. "Music of the Regions". 2000. In Broughton, Simon and Ellingham, Mark with McConnachie, James and Duane, Orla (Ed.), World Music, Vol. 1: Africa, Europe and the Middle East, pp 103–113. Rough Guides Ltd, Penguin Books.

Further reading

External links
 Rap in France - feature on French rap music
 
French styles of music